Catwalk! is a series of collages created by Christiaan Tonnis.

Description

Catwalk! exhibits a series of collages created of cat's heads on women's physiques. The most known physiques displayed are those of Virginia Woolf "with big, sad eyes" and Kate Moss.

Video

The video "Catwalk" has been shown in 2007 at blogs.elle.fr.

Exhibitions
 2007 "CATWALK!", Eulengasse, Frankfurt
 2007 "Sem Palavras/Ohne Worte", Instituto Histórico de Olinda, Olinda
 2009 "Traumwelten/CATWALK!", Burg Frauenstein, Mining am Inn

References

External links 
 "Catwalk" (Video) ELLE - I LOVE LUX, un blog de Francine Vormese, Paris, 2007-07-01
 "Christiaan Tonnis CATWALK!" (German), kunstaspekte.de, 04 2007

Contemporary works of art
Portrait art
Collage